The University of Pennsylvania School of Nursing (more commonly referred to as Penn Nursing) is an undergraduate and graduate institution at the University of Pennsylvania, located in Philadelphia. According to U.S. News & World Report, the School of Nursing at Penn is among the top-ranked undergraduate and graduate nursing schools in the United States. The School of Nursing receives approximately $480 million in funding from the National Institutes of Health, making it among the most highly funded nursing schools in the country.

Facilities
Penn Nursing's main building, Claire M. Fagin Hall, is located south of the center of campus. Within a block of Fagin Hall are the Hospital of the University of Pennsylvania, the Children's Hospital of Philadelphia, and buildings of the Perelman School of Medicine.

The Tri-Nursing Education Building (or Tri-NEB), originally built in 1972, was later named for Claire M. Fagin, a former dean of Penn Nursing who later served as Interim President of the university. The building originally housed the Hospital of the University of Pennsylvania's School of Nursing which was a three-year diploma in nursing. Students there also attended classes at UPenn for chemistry, anatomy and physiology, and two electives of their choice. The school was founded in 1886 and graduated its last class in 1978.

When Penn accepted responsibility for HUP in 1973, HUP's school of nursing was absorbed into Penn Nursing.

In February 2022, Leonard Lauder of The Estée Lauder Companies, donated $125 million to establish a new tuition-free nurse practitioner program.

Academics

Degree programs 
At the undergraduate level, the School of Nursing offers traditional and accelerated Bachelor of Science in Nursing programs. From October 2014 through September 2015, the NCLEX first-time test-takers pass rate was 93.04%. While Yale University and Columbia University also have nursing programs, Penn is the only Ivy League institution to offer a baccalaureate nursing program.

Penn Nursing has 15 masters programs, including nurse practitioner, clinical nurse specialist, certified nurse-midwife, as well as a doctoral certified registered nurse anesthetist program. The majority of Penn Nursing's graduate programs are top-ranked in their specialty. Penn Nursing also offers a PhD program.

Students can also earn joint degrees from the School of Nursing and other schools in the University of Pennsylvania. Options include the Nursing and Health Care Management program with the Wharton School, leading to a BSN and a Bachelor of Science in economics. There are also dual-degree and joint degree options for nursing students of different degree levels and in different schools in the university.

Study abroad 

Nursing students have the option to apply to various study abroad programs during the spring or fall semesters or during one of the two summer sessions of Penn's academic calendar. Sites include Australia, England, Botswana, Hong Kong, Spain, and Thailand.

Notable people

Faculty 
 Linda Aiken, health services researcher
 Claire Fagin, Dean Emerita, first woman to serve as interim president of an Ivy League university
 Sarah H. Kagan, gerontological nurse and MacArthur fellow

Alumni 
 Ruth Lubic, nurse midwife and MacArthur fellow

Student 
 Anthony Scarpone-Lambert, inventor of uNight Light, "a wearable light-emitting diode, or LED, that allows nurses to illuminate their work space without interrupting a patient’s sleep."

Research centers 
 Barbara Bates Center for the Study of the History of Nursing
 Center for Global Women's Health
 Center for Health Outcomes and Policy Research
 NewCourtland Center for Transitions and Health

See also
 University of Pennsylvania
 Hospital of the University of Pennsylvania
 Guatemala Health Initiative, a University of Pennsylvania-affiliated private aid organization; partners with the School of Nursing in  program delivery

References

External links
 

Educational institutions established in 1935
University of Pennsylvania schools
Nursing schools in Pennsylvania
1935 establishments in Pennsylvania